Government degree colleges in India are public-sector educational institutes managed primarily through rules and regulations of government accompanied by University Grants Commission (India) (UGC). Education in India has been categorized into elementary, secondary and higher education. The aim behind the formation of the government degree colleges is to provide higher education to undergraduates, postgraduates and doctoral research scholars in various streams and courses recognized by UGC of India. Presently, the standards have been set up for the classifications of the institutes in 2 (f) and 12 (b) category, which is certified by the UGC, New Delhi to maintain the excellence in higher education. The government degree colleges are fully managed by government, either central or at state level, and affiliated to the universities for course structures. Moreover, the government degree college as the institute of higher education, are administered and controlled by the principal who serves as the head. Teachers (Assistant Professor, Associate Professor, and Professor) are appointed through Public Service Commissions (a government body under the articles from 315 to 323 of the Constitution of India) of central and state governments. The teachers appointed through the public service commissions are government servants with Group A post and are gazetted in nature. Education is the matter of concurrent lists in India; the government from the centre or from the states has the right to formulate law on higher education.

Government degree colleges in territories of India

Andaman and Nicobar Islands
 Mahatma Gandhi Government College
 Tagore Government College of Education
 Dr B R Ambedkar Institute of Technology Port Blair

Andhra Pradesh
 Sir C.R. Reddy Educational Institutions
 Government Arts College, Rajahmundry
 Government Medical College, Anantapur
 Maharajah's Government College of Music and Dance
 P. V. K. N. Government College
 Silver Jubilee Government Degree College

Arunachal Pradesh
 Dera Natung Government College

Assam
 Cotton College
 North Lakhimpur College
 Diphu College

Bihar
 Babasaheb Bhimrao Ambedkar Bihar University
 Bhagalpur College of Engineering
 Indian Institute of Technology 		
 Rajendra Agricultural University 	
 Jawaharlal Nehru Engineering College	
 Maulana Azad College of Engineering and Technology
 National Institute of Technology

Goa
Government College of Arts, Science and Commerce, Khandola

Gujarat
 Government Engineering College, Patan
 Government Engineering College, Dahod
 Sardar Vallabhbhai National Institute of Technology, Surat

Himachal Pradesh
 Jawaharlal Nehru Government Engineering College, Sundernagar
 Government College Solan
 Government College Kumarsain

Jammu & Kashmir
 Government Degree College, Ganderbal
 Government Degree College Kathua
 Government Degree College Sopore
 Government College of Engineering and Technology, Jammu
 Government Degree College, Bhaderwah
 Government Degree College, Budgam
 Government Degree College, Kalakote

Jharkhand
Rajendra institute of medical science and research centre

Karnataka
 Government Dental College, Bangalore
 Government Pharmacy College, Bangalore
 Vedavathi Government First Grade College, Karnataka
 Government Engineering College, Ramanagaram
 Govt First Grade College Ankola,

Kerala
 Government College, Chittur
 Government College, Kattappana
 Government College, Kottayam
 Government College, Manimalakkunnu
 Government Homoeopathic Medical College, Calicut
 Government Law College, Calicut
 Government College of Engineering, Kannur
 Government Medical College, Kottayam
 Government Engineering College, Idukki, Painavu
 Government Engineering College, Thrissur
 Government Law College, Thrissur
 Government Law College, Thiruvananthapuram
 Government Medical College, Thiruvananthapuram
 Government Medical College, Thrissur
 Government Medical College, Kozhikode
 Government Engineering College, Kozhikode
 Government Engineering College, Sreekrishnapuram
 Government Engineering College, Wayanad
 Government Law College, Ernakulam
 Government Victoria College, Palakkad
 Sri C. Achutha Menon Government College

Madhya Pradesh
 Government Degree College, Bijawar
 Government Engineering College, Jabalpur
 Government Engineering College, Rewa
 Government Girls P.G. College, Chhatarpur
 Government Maharaja P.G. College, Chhatarpur

Maharashtra
 Dr. V. M. Government Medical College, Solapur
 Government Colleges Hostel, Mumbai
 Government Law College, Mumbai
 Government College of Engineering, Amravati
 Government College of Engineering, Aurangabad
 Government College of Engineering, Karad
 Government Medical College, Aurangabad
 Government Medical College, Akola
 Government Medical College, Latur
 Shri Bhausaheb Hire Government Medical College, Dhule
 Shri Vasantrao Naik Government Medical College, Yavatmal

Mizoram
Pachhunga University College, the constituent college of Mizoram University
Aizawl College
Zirtiri Residential Science College, Aizawl
College of Teachers Education, Aizawl
Lunglei College
Champhai college
Saiha College
Government Serchhip College
Hrangbana College
Aizawl West College
J.Thankima College
T. Romana College
Saitual College
Lawngtlai College
Khawzawl College
Mizoram Law College
Regional Institute of Paramedical and Nursing Aizawl
Mizoram College of Nursing
National Institute of Electronics and Information Technology, Aizawl
Higher and Technical Institute of Mizoram

Orissa
 Government Autonomous College, Angul
 Government Autonomous College, Bhawanipatna
 Government Autonomous G.M. College, Sambalpur
 Panchayat College, Bargarh
 Ravenshaw University, Cuttack

Punjab
 Government College of Education, Chandigarh
 Government Medical College, Amritsar
 Government Medical College, Patiala
 NJSA Government College, Kapurthala
 Satish Chander Dhawan Government College For Boys
 Guru Nanak College, Budhlada
Govt. Science College, Chatrapur

Rajasthan
 Babu Shobha Ram Government. Arts College, Alwar
 Government College, Ajmer
 Government Engineering College, Ajmer
 Government Engineering College, Jhalawar
 Government Mahila Engineering College
 Government Medical College, Kota
 Shri Kalyan Government College, Sikar
 Government commerce College, kota

Sikkim

Tamil Nadu
 CPT, Taramani
 Alagappa Government Arts College, Karaikudi
 Dr. Ambedkar Government Law College, Chennai
 Government Arts College, Coimbatore
 Government Arts College, Kumbakonam
 Government Arts College, Ooty
 Government College of Fine Arts, Chennai
 Government College of Technology, Coimbatore
 Government Law College, Coimbatore
 Government College of Arts & Science (Surandai)
 Government College of Engineering, Bargur
 Government College of Engineering, Salem
 Government College of Engineering, Tirunelveli
 Government Law College, Tiruchirapalli
 Government Polytechnic College, Nagercoil
 Kanyakumari Government Medical College
 Loganatha Narayanasamy Government Arts College, Ponneri
 Quaid-e-Millath Government College for Women

Telangana
 Government Nizamia Tibbi College, Hyderabad
 Pingle Government Degree College for Women, Warangal

Tripura
 Agartala Government Medical College

Uttar Pradesh
 Government College of Architecture, Lucknow
 Government Sanskrit College, Varanasi
 Ramabai Government Women Post Graduate College, Ambedkar Nagar
 SLJB PG College

In Uttar Pradesh, government controlled degree colleges are only 167 in numbers at present for the courses in undergraduate (UG), postgraduate (PG) and doctoral research programs in Humanities (Arts), Science and Commerce streams. The Department of Higher Education of Government of Uttar Pradesh directly controls the institutes through Directorate of Higher Education, Allahabad.

Teachers for the Government Degree Colleges are recruited through Public Service Commission of Uttar Pradesh which is located in Allahabad.

Uttrakhand
 National Institute of Technology Uttarakhand, Srinagar

West Bengal
 Darjeeling Government College, Darjeeling
 Acharya Prafulla Chandra Roy Government College, Siliguri, Darjeeling
 Jalpaiguri Government Engineering College, Jalpaiguri
 ABN Seal College, A Govt. College in Coochbehar
 Government College of Engineering and Textile Technology, Berhampore, Murshidabad
 Krishnagar Government College, Nadia
 Durgapur Government College, Burdwan
 Kalyani Govt. Engineering College, Kalyani, Nadia
 Hooghly Mohsin College, Hooghly
 Chandernagore Government College, Hooghly
 College of Textile Technology, Serampore, Hooghly
 Barasat Government College, N-24 Parganas
 Taki Government College, N-24 Parganas
 Bidhannagar College, N-24 Parganas
 Maulana Azad College, Kolkata
 Lady Brabourne College, Kolkata
 Bethune College, Kolkata
 Sanskrit College, Kolkata
 Goenka College of Commerce and Business Administration, Kolkata
 Government College of Engineering and Ceramic Technology, Kolkata
 Government College of Engineering and Leather Technology, Kolkata
 Jhargram Raj College, West Midnapore
 Haldia Government College, East Midnapore
 Government General Degree College, Mangalkote
 Muragachha Government College, Muragachha
 Government General Degree College, Kalna
 Government College of Art & Craft, K
 Kushmandi Government College.   
 Government General Degree College, Singur
 Kaliganj Government College, Debagram
 Cooch Behar Government Engineering College
 Katwa college, Katwa, West Bengal
 Ramakrishna Mission Shikshanamandira, Belur Math, Howrah

See also 
Higher education in India
University Grants Commission (India)
National Assessment and Accreditation Council

References

External links
University Grants Commission
Department of Higher Education, Government of India
Government of Uttar Pradesh
Department of Higher Education, Government of Uttar Pradesh

Government universities and colleges in India